José Miguel Martínez Martínez (born April 1, 1971) is a Dominican former Major League Baseball pitcher.

References 

1971 births
Binghamton Mets players
Columbia Mets players
Dominican Republic expatriate baseball players in Canada
Dominican Republic expatriate baseball players in the United States
Edmonton Trappers players
Gulf Coast Mets players
Las Vegas Stars (baseball) players

Living people
Major League Baseball pitchers
Major League Baseball players from the Dominican Republic
San Diego Padres players
St. Lucie Mets players
Wichita Wranglers players